Cuba has an environment which includes very wide variety of different natural habitats and is home to large number of species, many of them endangered. Since the arrival of European settlers Cuba has suffered from deforestation as a result of more and more forest area being taken over by humans to use them for agricultural production. Cutting down trees for firewood and to obtain materials for building has contributed to the loss of forests and extinction of some species. Environmental awareness has since increased in Cuba and in the late 1990s and in the 2000s Cuban government has started new programs to protect the environment and to increase forest coverage.

Environmental issues

Soil degradation and desertification are the main causes of environmental problems. In addition, Cuba has other issues such as deforestation, water pollution, the loss of biodiversity, and air pollution. Soil degradation and desertification are produced by the lack of good farming techniques and natural disasters. Deforestation is killing the forest, for example, cutting down trees. Water pollution is the contamination of water caused by different industries. Also, the loss of biological diversity is caused by the extinction of different animal species. Lastly, air pollution largely caused by the increasing number of "old" cars that fill Cuba's streets.

Cuba had a 2018 Forest Landscape Integrity Index mean score of 5.4/10, ranking it 102nd globally out of 172 countries.

Environmental solutions
One of the main solutions used by Cuba to regulate the environmental problem was creating an Environmental Educational program. This helped with the environmental problems by educating Cuban people about observing the environment. For example, the community was contributing to neighborhood clean-up techniques. The government created new methods to prevent the destruction of the environment, such as organic farming versus using chemicals to treat the lands. Designated areas were built for garbage and industrial waste instead of dumping them into the Havana Bay.

References